Kingdomware Technologies, Inc. v. United States, 579 U.S. ___ (2016), was a United States Supreme Court case in which the Court held that the Department of Veterans Affairs must apply the "Rule of Two" when considering and awarding contracts under the Veterans Benefits, Health Care, and Information Technology Act of 2006. 

By containing the word "shall" the rule becomes mandatory, not discretionary, regardless of whether the rule is being used to meet annual minimum contracting goals.

Opinion of the Court 
Associate Justice Clarence Thomas authored a unanimous opinion.

References

External links
 
 SCOTUSblog coverage

United States Supreme Court cases
United States Supreme Court cases of the Roberts Court
2016 in United States case law
United States Department of Veterans Affairs
Government procurement in the United States